Eclypso is an album by pianist Tommy Flanagan, bassist George Mraz, and drummer Elvin Jones recorded in 1977 for the Enja label.

Reception

AllMusic awarded the album 3 stars with Ron Wynn calling it an "Exceptional late '70s trio date, with pianist Tommy Flanagan displaying the hard bop proficiency that's been taken for granted" and stating "His lines, phrasing, and creative solos, plus his interaction with bassist George Mraz and drummer Elvin Jones, won the album rave reviews".

Track listing
 "Oleo" (Sonny Rollins) – 4:11
 "Denzil's Best" (Denzil Best) – 5:31
 "A Blue Time" (Tadd Dameron) – 6:14
 "Relaxin' at Camarillo" (Charlie Parker) – 4:36
 "Cup Bearers" (Tom McIntosh) – 3:48
 "Eclypso" (Tommy Flanagan) – 12:28
 "Confirmation" (Charlie Parker) – 6:07

Personnel 
Tommy Flanagan – piano
George Mraz – bass
Elvin Jones – drums

References 

1970 albums
Tommy Flanagan albums
Enja Records albums